August Fuchs (1839, Beruch, St. Gearshon – 1904, Bornich) was a German entomologist who specialised in Lepidoptera.  He wrote  Kleinschmetterlinge der Loreley-Gegend Stettin ent. Ztg. 56 (1-6) : 21-52 (1895) in which he first described Capperia loranus and
Über die neuesten Lepidopterologischen Forschungen in der Loreley-Gegend Jahrbücher des Nassauischen Vereins für Naturkunde 52: 159 - 173 (1899). His collection of Palearctic lepidoptera is in Museum Wiesbaden

References 
Groll, E. K. 2017: Biographies of the Entomologists of the World. – Online database, version 8, Senckenberg Deutsches Entomologisches Institut, Müncheberg – URL: sdei.senckenberg.de/biografies
Roth, W. 1929 Beitrag zur Geschichte der Insektensammlung des Naturhistorischen Museums Wiesbaden. Jahrbücher des Nassauischen Vereins für Naturkunde. Wiesbaden., Wiesbaden 80, S. 47-50

German lepidopterists
1904 deaths
1839 births
People from Rhein-Lahn-Kreis
19th-century German zoologists
20th-century German zoologists
Date of birth missing
Date of death missing